The 1975 European Ladies' Team Championship took place 3–6 July at Golf de Saint-Cloud in Paris, France. It was the ninth women's golf amateur European Ladies' Team Championship.

Venue 
The hosting club had previously hosted the men's professional Open de France ten times. It purchased the estate, situated in Garches, 12 kilometres west of the city center of Paris, in 1911. Harry Colt designed the first 18-hole course, the Green Course, inaugurated in 1913. A second 18-hole course, the Yellow Course, was completed in 1930.

Format 
All participating teams played one qualification round of stroke-play with up to five players, counted the four best scores for each team.

The six best teams formed flight A, in knock-out match-play over the next three days. The teams were seeded based on their positions after the stroke-play. The teams placed first and second were directly qualified for the semi finals. The team placed third was drawn to play the quarter final against the team placed sixth and the teams placed fourth and fifth met each other. In each match between two nation teams, two 18-hole foursome games and five 18-hole single games were played. Teams were allowed to switch players during the team matches, selecting other players in to the afternoon single games after the morning foursome games. Games all square after 18 holes were declared halved, if the team match was already decided.

The four teams placed 7–10 in the qualification stroke-play formed Flight B and the three teams placed 11–13 formed Flight C, to play similar knock-out play to decide their final positions.

Teams 
13 nation teams contested the event. It was the same number of teams and the same nations represented as at the previous championship two years earlier. Each team consisted of a minimum of four players.

Players in the leading teams

Other participating teams

Winners 
Team Ireland, a combined team from Northern Ireland and the Republic of Ireland, won the opening 18-hole competition, with a score of 10 over par 302, one stroke ahead of team Scotland. Defending champions England did not make it to the quarter finals, finishing eight.

Individual leaders in the opening 18-hole stroke-play qualifying competition was Sandra Needham, England, and Liv Wollin, Sweden, each with a score of 3-under-par 70, two shots ahead of Catherine Lacoste de Prado, France. Wollin previously led the individual competition in the 1963 championship 12 years earlier and came back in 1975 after being absent in 1973 due to the birth of her child. Lacoste made her second appearance in the championship, being absent in 1965 and 1967 due to participation in the U.S. Women's Open, which she won in 1967. Wollin and Lacoste came to meet in the singles in the quarter final between Sweden and France. Wollin won the game 3 and 2, but, champions to be, France won the match 4–3.

Host nation France advanced to the final, beat team Spain 4–2 and earned their fourth title. Team Ireland, for the first time on the podium, beat Scotland 4–3 in the third place match.

Results 
Qualification round

Team standings

* Note: In the event of a tie the order was determined by the better non-counting score.

Individual leaders

 Note: There was no official award for the lowest individual score.

Flight A

Bracket

Final games

* Note: Game declared halved, since team match already decided.

Final standings

Sources:

See also 
 Espirito Santo Trophy – biennial world amateur team golf championship for women organized by the International Golf Federation.
 European Amateur Team Championship – European amateur team golf championship for men organised by the European Golf Association.

References

External links 
 European Golf Association: Results

European Ladies' Team Championship
Golf tournaments in France
European Ladies' Team Championship
European Ladies' Team Championship
European Ladies' Team Championship